The 2021 UMass Minutemen baseball team represented the University of Massachusetts Amherst during the 2021 NCAA Division I baseball season. The Minutemen played their home games at Earl Lorden Field as a members of the Atlantic 10 Conference. They were led by head coach Matt Reynolds, in his 4th season at UMass.

Previous season

The 2020 UMass Minutemen baseball team notched a 1–8 (0–0) regular season record. The season prematurely ended on March 12, 2020 due to concerns over the COVID-19 pandemic.

Preseason

Coaches Poll 
The Atlantic 10 baseball coaches' poll was released on February 18, 2021. UMass was picked to finish last in the Atlantic 10 regular season.

Game log

Rankings

References

External links 
 UMass Baseball
 2021 UMass Baseball Schedule

UMass
UMass Minutemen baseball seasons
UMass Minutemen baseball team